Bruce Alexander Grant (4 April 1925 – 3 August 2022) was an Australian journalist, foreign correspondent, government advisor, diplomat, novelist and author of several books on Australian politics and foreign policy.

Early life 
Grant was born in Perth on 4 April 1925, and grew up in Kalgarin in outback Western Australia. His success in a state exam won him a place at Perth Modern School.

Journalist 
Grant cut short his final year of secondary schooling to join Perth afternoon newspaper, the Daily News as a reporter. After military service, in 1946 he married Enid Mary Walters and they lived with children Susan, Johanna and James at 3 Hawthorn Gve. Hawthorn. He studied arts at the University of Melbourne, under Manning Clark (to whom later in London he became close), and where he could combine the academic study with a diploma course in journalism. From that he launched a career writing criticism on Australian film and theatre noting in 1958, that;
If we get a dramatist with the same poetic vision for lonely heroism as the painter Sidney Nolan and novelist Patrick White, the stage will need more air .

From 1951 was employed as film critic, by Melbourne's The Age newspaper where he was the only university graduate on staff. From 1953 he also presented film reviews in a radio program on 3AR, and promoted the idea of a Melbourne film festival. In 1954, then living at 29 Torbay St., Macleod, he left the country to become the paper's London correspondent, writing a column entitled "A Window In London", then was joined by wife Enid, whose father died in an accidental drowning shortly before her departure.

In the UK Grant covered subjects as diverse as Britain's "Color Problem," buskers, Labour party disunity, Malta's bid for independence, London's premiere of the Australian play Summer of the Seventeenth Doll;  Robert Menzies' 1956 failed attempt to negotiate with Egypt's president Gamal Nasser during the Suez Crisis; and the Hungarian revolution. Conversely he was writing features on Australian subjects, such as the Eureka Stockade, a shearers' strike, and education in the Outback, for The Guardian, and occasionally for its sister paper The Observer, whose Guy Wint wrote one of the first reviews of Grant's Indonesia in 1964, which he said; "must be the model of its kind."

In September 1958 he flew from the UK to Harvard University via New York.

In 1964, Grant resigned as The Age’s Washington correspondent, having reported from there during the terms of two Presidents, Kennedy and Johnson.

Intellectual, creative and administrative contributions to the arts 
Grant also wrote for magazines as varied as Walkabout, The New Yorker, Mademoiselle, Playboy, Cleo, The Port Phillip Gazette, The Bulletin, Quadrant, Overland and Meanjin, and was an author of three novels on the theme 'Love in the Asian Century', and of short stories, poetry, and essays including "The Great Pretender at the Bar of Justice," written at the trial of Slobodan Milošević, published in The Best Australian Essays 2002; and "Bali: The Spirit of Here and Now," written after the October 2002 bombings, published in The Best Australian Essays 2004.

He spent periods researching and teaching in universities, including as a Nieman Fellow at Harvard, and a member of the councils of Monash, where he lectured in statecraft to young diplomats, and Deakin universities.

Grant promoted Australian culture, and its links with Asia as chair of the Australian Dance Theatre, and the Victorian Premier's Literary Awards, and president of Melbourne's International Film Festival, and of the Spoleto Festival, which became the Melbourne International Arts Festival.

Foreign affairs 

Grant's first book Indonesia of 1964 came at a time of high tension between Britain and Indonesia over the year-old Federation of Malaysia, which Indonesian leaders opposed and which resulted in the Indonesia–Malaysia confrontation. He was subsequently witness to, and an influence on, centres of power in Australia for several decades, as journalist and foreign correspondent, diplomat, public intellectual, and advisor to Menzies, whose letter of reference to ambassadors facilitated his reporting as Asian correspondent, and to subsequent governments from Whitlam to Hawke and Keating.

Grant was chairman of the Australia-Indonesia Institute and his book Indonesia (1964) remains a classic and insightful study of Australia's relations with its most powerful near neighbour.

From 1972 Grant advised the new prime minister Gough Whitlam, who “startled officials at a meeting by introducing me as his Dr Kissinger,” and appointed Grant as  Australian High Commissioner to India (1973–1976) in which post he was an early advocate of the importance of Asia to Australia, having asked as he diverged from his career as journalist;
Can the newspapers stop Australia from turning inward, from becoming isolationist? (Roy Milne Memorial Lecture, 7 August 1969)Grant campaigned to abolish the White Australia policy, opposed the Vietnam war as counterproductive to Australia's credibility in S.E. Asia, and joined the Australian Committee for a New China Policy, urging recognition of the People's Republic of China. Through his The Boat People he analysed, and promoted understanding of, the political causes and social ramifications of increasing numbers of Vietnamese refugees arriving by boat on Australia's shores.

Consultant to the federal Minister for Foreign Affairs and Trade, Gareth Evans, 1988–91, they co-wrote Australia's Foreign Relations in the World of the 1990s (1991).

In 2008, Grant initiated the colloquium 'Australia as a Middle-Ranking Power' hosted in Canberra at Manning Clark House in Conjunction with the Australian Institute of International Affairs.

Legacy 
In 2017, Grant released his memoir Subtle moments: scenes on a life's journey, named from a phrase from Albert Camus who wrote of "that subtle moment when man glances backward over his life ... contemplat[ing] that series of unrelated actions which become his fate"

Bruce Grant died 3 August 2022, at the age of 97. He was survived by his sister, Jocelyn, and four of his five children; Susan, Jaems, David and Ben, six grandchildren and two great-grandchildren. He was predeceased by his sister Audrey, daughter Johanna, and first wife Enid.

Awards 
 2003: Doctor of Letters (honoris causa), Monash University
 2010: Distinguished Fellow, Australian Institute of International Affairs

Books

References 

1925 births
2022 deaths
Australian critics
High Commissioners of Australia to India
Ambassadors of Australia to Nepal
Australian essayists
Australian male novelists
20th-century Australian journalists
Australian political commentators
Writers from Perth, Western Australia